Valda is a frazione of the comune of Altavalle in Trentino in the northern Italian region Trentino-Alto Adige/Südtirol, located about  northeast of Trento. 

It was an independent commune until 1 January 2016.

Former municipalities of Trentino